Callulina laphami is a species of frogs in the family Brevicipitidae. It was discovered in 2010 during a survey of rainforests in the northern part of the Eastern Arc Mountains of Tanzania. It is present at a single location in the Kindoroko and Minja Forest Reserves in the Pare Mountains. The forest area in which this frog lives is a remnant patch of a larger forest with trees in the surrounding area being felled for agricultural development, and the International Union for Conservation of Nature has rated the frog's conservation status as "critically endangered".

Description
Callulina laphami is a robust species of brevicipitid frog with a plump body and distinctive ridges of glands on its arms and legs. It has no tympani and no enlarged pads on the tips of its fingers and toes. This frog's dorsal surface is dark brown, its flanks are tan and its ventral surface yellowish-cream. In most individuals there is a red-coloured band between the eyes, but in some individuals, this band is green. The call, emitted by the male, is a rapid series of pulsed trills.

Distribution

Ecology
C. laphami is found in humid montane forests, sometimes occurring in the vicinity of streams and sometimes on drier ridges. It hides under rocks or logs during the day and at night can be found clambering in bushes and low trees a metre or two off the ground. Its breeding habits are unknown but it is likely that juvenile frogs develop directly from eggs laid on the ground without an intervening larval stage.

Status
Although the forest parcel consists of two forest reserves where the frog receives some protection, small-scale logging and human encroachment continues inside the reserve boundaries. At the moment the frog is present in reasonable numbers but its restricted range makes it at risk from even small alterations to its environment, and the International Union for Conservation of Nature has rated its conservation status as "critically endangered".

References 

Callulina
Endemic fauna of Tanzania
Amphibians of Tanzania
Frogs of Africa
Amphibians described in 2010